Chantrey may refer to:

 Francis Leggatt Chantrey (1781-1841), English sculptor
 Julia Chantrey (born 1980), Canadian actress
 Chantrey Inlet, a bay on the Arctic coast of Canada

See also
 Chantry (disambiguation)